The 21 Irrefutable Laws of Leadership: Follow Them and People Will Follow You is a 1998 book written by John C. Maxwell and published by Thomas Nelson. It is one of several books by Maxwell on the subject of leadership. It is the book for which he is best-known. The book was listed on The New York Times Best Seller list in April 1999 after marketing company ResultSource manipulated the list by making it look like copies of The 21 Irrefutable Laws of Leadership had been purchased by thousands of individuals when, in actuality, ResultSource had simply made a bulk order of the book. The book had sold more than one million copies by 2015. Christian businessperson John Faulkner was inspired to found Christian business magazine TwoTen when he read The 21 Irrefutable Laws of Leadership. Professional basketball player Harrison Barnes read and spoke positively of the book. US swimmer Annie Chandler Grevers wrote of Maxwell's book, "it's cheesy, but ... it did me some good". Columnist Michael Hiltzik of the Los Angeles Times criticized Maxwell for including in the book "the insidious subtext ... that externalities have nothing to do with your failure", an assertion that Hiltzik argues research studies have demonstrated to be false.
John Maxwell Team mastermind groups have developed from the principles in this book.

See also 
 Autonomy
 Determination
 Empowerment
 Like attracts like
 Intuition
 Journalism
 Mastermind inner circle
 Moral character
 Openness
 Praise
 Positive psychology
 Power
 Reading body language
 Rapport
 Respect
 Trust
 Trends
 Investment
 Wu wei

References

Bibliography

1998 non-fiction books
American non-fiction books
English-language books
Thomas Nelson (publisher) books
Leadership studies
Self-help books